The Causes of Evolution is a 1932 book on evolution by J.B.S. Haldane (1990 edition ), based on a series of January 1931 lectures entitled "A Re-examination of Darwinism".  It was influential in the founding of population genetics and the modern synthesis.

Chapters
It contains the following chapters:

Introduction
Variation within a Species
The Genetical Analysis of Interspecific Differences
Natural Selection
What is Fitness?
Conclusion

The book also contains an extensive appendix containing the majority of Haldane's mathematical treatment of the subject.

See also

 Evolutionary biology

External links
 Description by Princeton U Press
 Contemporary review by R.A. Fisher
 Review of the 1990 Princeton University reprint

1932 non-fiction books
Books about evolution
Modern synthesis (20th century)
Population genetics
Works by J. B. S. Haldane
1932 in biology